Indian actress Deepika Padukone primarily appears in Hindi films. Her first screen appearance was in Himesh Reshammiya's music video "Naam Hai Tera" in 2005. Padukone made her film debut by playing the titular role in the Kannada-language film Aishwarya (2006). Her first Hindi film release came the following year with Farah Khan's melodrama Om Shanti Om, in which she played dual roles opposite Shah Rukh Khan. She won the Filmfare Award for Best Female Debut for it. Her sole film role in 2008 was as one of Ranbir Kapoor's love interests in Bachna Ae Haseeno. Padukone's first film release of 2009, the kung fu comedy Chandni Chowk to China, proved to be a box office flop, but her next release, Imtiaz Ali's romance Love Aaj Kal, opposite Saif Ali Khan, was a success. Of Padukone's five film releases in 2010, only the comedy Housefull was financially profitable. The series of poorly received films continued with both her 2011 releases, Aarakshan and Desi Boyz. 

The acclaimed role of an impulsive party-girl in Homi Adajania's Cocktail (2012) proved to be a breakthrough for Padukone. The year 2013 was key for Padukone when all four of her films were box office hits. Among these were two of the highest-grossing Indian filmsthe romantic comedies Yeh Jawaani Hai Deewani and Chennai Express. She also won the Filmfare Award for Best Actress for playing a character based on Juliet in Sanjay Leela Bhansali's tragic romance Goliyon Ki Raasleela Ram-Leela (2013). In 2014, Padukone appeared in the Tamil animation film Kochadaiiyaan and played a bar dancer in the top-grossing heist film Happy New Year. The following year, she played a headstrong daughter in Shoojit Sircar's comedy-drama Piku, which earned Padukone her second Best Actress award at Filmfare, and portrayed the warrior Mastani in Bhansali's top-grossing historical romance Bajirao Mastani. 

Padukone's first project in Hollywoodthe action film XXX: Return of Xander Cage (2017)earned over US$345 million worldwide. In 2018, she reunited with Bhansali in another top-grossing period film, Padmaavat, in which she portrayed the titular role of Rani Padmavati. After a small break from acting, she starred in Chhapaak (2020) and 83 (2021), both produced under her own company Ka Productions, but they were not financially profitable.

Films 

All films are in Hindi unless otherwise noted.

Music videos

See also 
 List of awards and nominations received by Deepika Padukone

Footnotes

References

External links 
 
 Deepika Padukone on Bollywood Hungama

Indian filmographies
Actress filmographies